Sinogram may refer to:
 Sinograph, a Chinese character (Hanzi), especially when used in a different language
 Radon transform, a type of integral transform in mathematics
 A visual representation of the raw data obtained in the operation of computed tomography

See also 

 Sonogram (disambiguation)